A referendum was held in Slovenia on 12 December 2010 on a new public broadcaster law.

Issues
The reform was an attempt to reverse the reform of 2005 proposed by the conservative Prime Minister Janez Janša, which was widely seen as an attempt to move the public broadcaster Radiotelevizija Slovenija to the right of the political spectrum. The RTVS referendum held that year narrowly approved the reform; polls indicated that the 2010 referendum would also see a close result at low turnout, with only 55.3% of voters interested in the referendum (28.4% to 26.9% in favour of the reform).

Results
The referendum failed clearly, but at a very low turnout, which was interpreted as the Slovenian voters being fed up with the large amount of referendums being held.

References

2010 referendums
2010 in Slovenia
Referendums in Slovenia
December 2010 events in Europe